Tommy Hoyland (born 14 June 1932) is an English former professional footballer who played as a wing half.

Career
Born in Sheffield, Hoyland played for Sheffield United, Bradford City and Retford Town.

His son, Jamie Hoyland played for Sheffield United from 1990-94.

References

1932 births
Living people
English footballers
Sheffield United F.C. players
Bradford City A.F.C. players
Retford United F.C. players
English Football League players
Association football midfielders